"My Wish Came True" is a song written by Ivory Joe Hunter and originally recorded by Elvis Presley with The Jordanaires.

It reached number 12 on the Billboard Hot 100 in 1959.

Track listing

Charts

References

External links 
 
 A Big Hunk o' Love / My Wish Came True on the Elvis Presley official website

1959 songs
1959 singles
Elvis Presley songs
Songs written by Ivory Joe Hunter